Gospel Duets with Treasured Friends is an album by American singer Brenda Lee. The album was released April 10, 2007 on Provident Music. It features several duets of Brenda Lee with other known artists.

Development 

Brenda Lee, who was born in Atlanta, Georgia, thought about recording a Gospel album, since she "grew up in the church and gospel music." According to her, Gospel music is her "heritage" and "roots in music". All of the songs chosen for the album are songs she grew up with. As she started recording, she decided to invite some artist friends to sing with her. Provident Music liked the idea and they decided to do it.

According to Brenda Lee, all the friends she called agreed to appear on the album, which made her feel "very blessed and very fortunate. It just all came together perfectly."

Track listing

Awards 

The album was nominated to a Dove Award for Country Album of the Year at the 39th GMA Dove Awards.

References

External links 

Gospel Duets with Treasured Friends on Amazon.com
Brenda Lee Interview on Country Stars Central

2007 albums
Brenda Lee albums
Gospel albums by American artists
Vocal duet albums